Khujomli (also Romanized as Khūjomlī and Khoojamli; also known as Khojom Bardī-ye Aqdasī and Kojun) is a village in Soltanali Rural District, in the Central District of Gonbad-e Qabus County, Golestan Province, Iran. At the 2006 census, its population was 353, in 72 families.

References 

Populated places in Gonbad-e Kavus County